Atarba is a genus of crane fly in the family Limoniidae.

Species
Subgenus Atarba Osten Sacken, 1869

A. almeidai Alexander, 1946
A. amabilis Alexander, 1928
A. angustipennis Alexander, 1928
A. anthracina Alexander, 1937
A. apache Alexander, 1949
A. aperta Alexander, 1926
A. apicispinosa Alexander, 1934
A. bellamyi Alexander, 1950
A. bifilosa Alexander, 1948
A. bifurcula Alexander, 1931
A. bipendula Alexander, 1966
A. biproducta Alexander, 1966
A. boliviana Alexander, 1930
A. brevicornis Alexander, 1929
A. brevissima Alexander, 1944
A. brunneicornis Alexander, 1916
A. bulbifera Alexander, 1943
A. capensis Alexander, 1917
A. cincticornis Alexander, 1916
A. circe Alexander, 1946
A. columbiana Alexander, 1913
A. cucullata Alexander, 1946
A. dasycera Alexander, 1948
A. diacantha Alexander, 1945
A. dilatistyla Alexander, 1966
A. dinematophora Alexander, 1943
A. distispina Alexander, 1969
A. fiebrigi Alexander, 1922
A. fieldiana Alexander, 1969
A. filicornis Alexander, 1922
A. forticornis Alexander, 1947
A. fuscoapicalis Alexander, 1944
A. heteracantha Alexander, 1943
A. hirticornis Alexander, 1943
A. idonea Alexander, 1939
A. incisurata Alexander, 1938
A. laddeyana Alexander, 1944
A. laterospina Alexander, 1962
A. longitergata Alexander, 1945
A. lyriformis Alexander, 1966
A. macracantha Alexander, 1943
A. margarita Alexander, 1979
A. megaphallus Alexander, 1921
A. melanomera Alexander, 1943
A. merita Alexander, 1938
A. mexicana Alexander, 1926
A. microphallus Alexander, 1944
A. multiarmata Alexander, 1943
A. nodulosa Alexander, 1939
A. pallidapex Alexander, 1943
A. panamensis Alexander, 1969
A. perincisa Alexander, 1948
A. picticornis Osten Sacken, 1869
A. procericornis Alexander, 1944
A. punctiscuta Alexander, 1922
A. pustulata Alexander, 1969
A. quasimodo Alexander, 1950
A. religiosa Alexander, 1946
A. restricta Alexander, 1943
A. scabrosa Alexander, 1944
A. scutata Alexander, 1939
A. serena Alexander, 1969
A. setilobata Alexander, 1964
A. sigmoidea Alexander, 1979
A. stigmosa Alexander, 1930
A. stuckenbergi Alexander, 1960
A. subdentata Alexander, 1952
A. subpatens Alexander, 1969
A. tatei Alexander, 1929
A. tetracantha Alexander, 1945
A. tuberculifera Alexander, 1943
A. tungurahuensis Alexander, 1946
A. unilateralis Alexander, 1931
A. varicornis Alexander, 1913
A. variispina Alexander, 1938
A. viridicolor Alexander, 1922
A. werneri Alexander, 1949

Subgenus Atarbodes Alexander, 1920

A. apoensis Alexander, 1932
A. argentata Edwards, 1928
A. bilobula Alexander, 1969
A. bipunctulata Alexander, 1932
A. bismila Alexander, 1969
A. crassispina Alexander, 1972
A. decincta Alexander, 1969
A. dicera Alexander, 1969
A. dolichophallus Alexander, 1960
A. fasciata Edwards, 1926
A. flava Brunetti, 1912
A. fuscicornis Edwards, 1916
A. hemimelas Alexander, 1960
A. infuscata Edwards, 1928
A. intermedia Alexander, 1956
A. issikiana Alexander, 1930
A. javanica Alexander, 1915
A. jeanneli (Riedel, 1914)
A. leptophallus Alexander, 1964
A. leptoxantha Alexander, 1928
A. limbata Edwards, 1933
A. marginata Edwards, 1928
A. minuticornis Alexander, 1930
A. pallidicornis Edwards, 1916
A. rhodesiae Alexander, 1948
A. sikkimensis Alexander, 1969
A. tergata Alexander, 1958
A. tergatoides Alexander, 1965
A. trimelania Alexander, 1963

Subgenus Ischnothrix Bigot, 1888

A. aetherea (Bigot, 1888)
A. aprica Alexander, 1962
A. argentinicola (Alexander, 1921)
A. augusta Theischinger, 1994
A. australasiae (Skuse, 1890)
A. berthae Alexander, 1948
A. bickeli Theischinger, 1996
A. brevilyra Alexander, 1966
A. brevisector (Alexander, 1935)
A. capitella Alexander, 1946
A. confluenta (Alexander, 1924)
A. connexa (Alexander, 1923)
A. delicatula (Philippi, 1866)
A. digitifera Alexander, 1946
A. eluta (Edwards, 1923)
A. fidelis (Alexander, 1929)
A. geminata Alexander, 1943
A. generosa (Alexander, 1922)
A. grampiana (Alexander, 1931)
A. helenae Alexander, 1948
A. ignithorax (Alexander, 1929)
A. integra Alexander, 1980
A. integriloba Alexander, 1943
A. iyouta Theischinger, 1994
A. lawsonensis (Skuse, 1890)
A. lloydi (Alexander, 1913)
A. mathewsi (Alexander, 1931)
A. melanolyra Alexander, 1980
A. mesocera (Alexander, 1929)
A. millaamillaa Theischinger, 1994
A. obtusiloba Alexander, 1944
A. patens (Alexander, 1940)
A. picturata (Alexander, 1929)
A. polyspila Alexander, 1971
A. rectangularis Alexander, 1955
A. scutellata (Alexander, 1929)
A. seticornis Alexander, 1946
A. spinituber Alexander, 1950
A. subaequalis Alexander, 1979
A. supplicata Alexander, 1943
A. tenuissima (Alexander, 1929)
A. thowla Theischinger, 1994
A. verticalis (Alexander, 1929)
A. voracis Alexander, 1948
A. waylehmina Theischinger, 1994
A. williamsi Theischinger, 1994

References

Limoniidae
Nematocera genera